Letoia is a genus of jumping spiders endemic to Venezuela. Its contains only one species, Letoia ephippiata.

Name
The species name is derived from Ancient Greek ephippi- "saddle".

References

  (2009): The world spider catalog, version 9.5. American Museum of Natural History.

External links
 Salticidae.org: Diagnostic drawings

Salticidae
Invertebrates of Venezuela
Monotypic Salticidae genera
Spiders of South America